"Somebody Wants Me Out of the Way" is a song written by Dennis Knutson and A.L. "Doodle" Owens and recorded by American country music artist George Jones. It was released in April 1986 as the third single from his album Who's Gonna Fill Their Shoes. The song peaked at number 9 on the Billboard Hot Country Singles chart.  The song is very much in the tradition of George's previous hits "Still Doin' Time" and "If Drinkin' Don't Kill Me (Her Memory Will)" in that it is a hard "drinking song," but it's also a "cheatin'" song, with the narrator suspicious that "Somebody keeps paying my bar tab but the bartender won't tell me who."  Jones delivers a soulful, bluesy vocal over a stone country arrangement with a prominent, shimmering acoustic guitar.  The singer, who had been a notorious drinker, was sober by this time thanks to his wife Nancy, who had gotten his career back on track after years of mismanagement and missed concert dates.

Chart performance

References 

1986 singles
George Jones songs
Epic Records singles
Songs written by A.L. "Doodle" Owens
Song recordings produced by Billy Sherrill
Songs written by Dennis Knutson